"Some Days Are Better" is a song recorded by Canadian country music artist Charlie Major. It was released in 1998 as the second single from his third studio album, Everything's Alright. It peaked at number four on the RPM Country Tracks chart in March 1998.

Chart performance

Year-end charts

References

1997 songs
1998 singles
Charlie Major songs
Songs written by Charlie Major
ViK. Recordings singles